Three ships of the Royal Navy have borne the name HMS Striker:

She was transferred to the Royal Navy under lend-lease and was launched in 1942. She was returned to the US Navy in 1946 and sold for breaking up. 
  was a landing ship, tank launched in 1945 as LST 3516. She was renamed HMS Striker in 1947 and was sold in 1970.
  was an  launched in 1983 and sold to Lebanon in 1992, being renamed Saida.

Royal Navy ship names